The 2008 Varsity Cup was contested from 18 February to 7 April 2008. The tournament (also known as the FNB Varsity Cup presented by Steinhoff International for sponsorship reasons) was the first season of the Varsity Cup, an annual inter-university rugby union competition featuring eight South African universities.

Competition

There were eight participating universities in the 2008 Varsity Cup. These teams played each other once over the course of the season. Most matches were played at the venue for either team, but the Round Five, Six and Seven matches were played at Outeniqua Park in George over the Easter weekend.

Teams received four points for a win and two points for a draw. Bonus points were awarded to teams that scored four or more tries in a game, as well as to teams that lost a match by seven points or less. Teams were ranked by log points, then points difference (points scored less points conceded).

The top four teams qualified for the title play-offs. In the semi-finals, the team that finished first had home advantage against the team that finished fourth, while the team that finished second had home advantage against the team that finished third. The winners of these semi-finals played each other in the final, at the home venue of the higher-placed team.

Teams

Standings

Results

Round 1

Round 2

Round 3

Round 4

Round 1 (rescheduled)

Round 5

Round 6

Round 7

Semi-finals

Final

Statistics

See also
 Varsity Cup

References

External links
 

2008
Varsity
Varsity SAF